Ricco Groß (also spelled Gross, born 22 August 1970) is a former German biathlete whose exploits made him one of the most successful biathletes of all time at the Winter Olympics and the World Championships.

Career
He has been married to his wife Kathrin since 1994 and they have three sons: Marco (born  1995), Simon (b. 1998), and Gabriel (b. 2004). He is a Hauptfeldwebel (Sergeant First Class) in the German Bundeswehr.

Groß started out as a cross-country skier but switched to biathlon at the age of 13. He made his World Cup debut at the age of 20. His first club was the SG Dynamo Klingenthal until 1991. In the Biathlon World Cup of 1997/1998, he came second in the overall competition. In the biathlon competition at the 1992, 1994, and 1998 Winter Olympics, he won gold medals as part of the men's 4 × 7.5 km relay team. At the 2002 Winter Olympics in the 4 × 7.5 km relay for men the German team won silver and at the 12.5 km pursuit for men, he won bronze for himself. He took a total of eight Olympic medals during his career, including four relay golds.

In the Biathlon World Championships sprint (10 km) he won bronze in 1995, and silver in 2003 and 2004. In 1999, 2003, and 2004, he won gold in the pursuit (12.5 km). In the individual (20 km), he won gold in 1997, silver in 1999, and bronze in 2003 and 2005. He took a total of nine World Championship titles. Groß took a total of 53 individual podium finishes in World Cup competition, including nine race wins.

After retiring from competition Groß settled in Ruhpolding. He has worked as a commentator on biathlon for German television and was appointed as coach of the German women's biathlon team in 2010. He was subsequently announced as senior trainer for the German IBU Cup team in April 2014. In August 2015 he became a senior coach for the Russian men's biathlon squad, agreeing a contract up to the 2017-18 season. In this role he guided the team to the 2016-17 relay World Cup title. In May 2018, Groß was announced as head coach for the Austrian men's biathlon team.

Biathlon results
All results are sourced from the International Biathlon Union.

Olympic Games
8 medals (4 gold, 3 silver, 1 bronze)

*Pursuit was added as an event in 2002, with mass start being added in 2006.

World Championships
20 medals (9 gold, 5 silver, 6 bronze)

*During Olympic seasons competitions are only held for those events not included in the Olympic program.
**Team was removed as an event in 1998, and pursuit was added in 1997 with mass start being added in 1999 and the mixed relay in 2005.

Individual victories
9 victories (3 In, 1 Sp, 4 Pu, 1 MS)

*Results are from UIPMB and IBU races which include the Biathlon World Cup, Biathlon World Championships and the Winter Olympic Games.

See also
List of multiple Olympic gold medalists
List of multiple Olympic gold medalists in one event

References

External links
 
 
 
 
 
 

1970 births
Living people
German male biathletes
Biathletes at the 1992 Winter Olympics
Biathletes at the 1994 Winter Olympics
Biathletes at the 1998 Winter Olympics
Biathletes at the 2002 Winter Olympics
Biathletes at the 2006 Winter Olympics
Olympic biathletes of Germany
Medalists at the 1992 Winter Olympics
Medalists at the 1994 Winter Olympics
Medalists at the 1998 Winter Olympics
Medalists at the 2002 Winter Olympics
Medalists at the 2006 Winter Olympics
Olympic medalists in biathlon
Olympic bronze medalists for Germany
Olympic silver medalists for Germany
Olympic gold medalists for Germany
Biathlon World Championships medalists
German cross-country skiing coaches
People from Erzgebirgskreis
Sportspeople from Saxony
20th-century German people
21st-century German people